Yahuma is a territory of the Democratic Republic of the Congo.  It is located in Tshopo Province.

References
Statoids.com  Retrieved December 8, 2010.

Populated places in Tshopo